Damien Alary (born January 17, 1951, in Pompignan) is a French politician and a member of the Socialist Party.

He was the chairman of the Departmental Council of Gard from 2001 to 2014, then briefly President of the regional council of Languedoc-Roussillon from 2014 to 2015.

Biography

Political career 
He joined the Socialist Party in 1977 after a meeting with Michel Rocard.

In 1979, he was elected mayor of Pompignan; in 1986, regional councilor of Languedoc-Roussillon, and in 1988, general councilor of the canton of Saint-Hippolyte-du-Fort.

He was elected in Gard's 5th constituency in 1997 and re-elected in 2002, from the Socialist Group.

After having chaired the socialist group, under the presidency of Alain Journet, within the general council of Gard from 1998 to 2001, he was elected president in 2001.

In 2004, he was elected first vice-president of the Regional Council. After the regional elections of 2004, he resigned because of multiple mandates.

On February 23, 2010, he was excluded from the Socialist Party following his rallying to the list led by Georges Frêche against that of the PS.

On October 28, 2010, after the death of Georges Frêche, the group of socialists excluded and related to the Regional Council elects its candidate for the presidency of the Languedoc-Roussillon region. Damien Alary lost against Christian Bourquin by 13 votes against 18 in secret ballots. The following November 10, Christian Bourquin was elected president of the regional council, and Robert Navarro replaced Damien Alary from the post of first vice-president he had held since 2004. Damien Alary then asked for his reinstatement in the PS, which he then obtained.

Suffering from cancer in the vocal cords, which he revealed himself in 2011, Damien Alary retained all of his elected functions and mandates. In January 2012, he affirmed “[to be] still good for the service” and “intact in [his] commitment”.

After considering a candidacy for the 2014 municipal elections in Nîmes, Damien Alary announced his resignation on September 10, 2013.

After the death of Christian Bourquin, on August 26, 2014, Damien Alary announced his candidacy for the presidency of the Regional Council of Languedoc-Roussillon. He was elected by the regional council on September 29.

In September 2015, it took the position, with Jean-Claude Gayssot, for the implementation of a European policy for welcoming “Mediterranean refugees”. On October 7, 2015, he succeeded Francina Armengol as the president of the Pyrenees-Mediterranean Euroregion.

During the 2015 regional election in Languedoc-Roussillon-Midi-Pyrénées, head of the PS list in Gard, he announced that he was leading his "last political fight".

Early life 
Coming from a family of Pompignan wine growers, he owned a vineyard and olive grove. He is married and has a son, Yannick, born in 1976, who became a notary in Alès.

Distinctions 

On June 3, 2010, Damien Alary received the Legion of Honour from Simone Veil at the Luxembourg Palace.

References 

Living people
1951 births
Members of the Regional Council of Occitania (administrative region)
Regional councillors of France
Departmental councillors (France)
People from Gard
Politicians from Occitania (administrative region)